This article lists the squads for the 2012 FIFA U-17 Women's World Cup held in Azerbaijan. Each competing federation is allowed a 21-player squad, which had to be submitted to FIFA.

Group A

Azerbaijan
Coach:  Sissy Raith

Canada
Coach: Bryan Rosenfeld

Colombia
Coach:  Fabian Taborda

Nigeria
Coach: Peter Dedevbo

Group B

France
Coach: Guy Ferrier

Gambia
Coach: Buba Jallow

North Korea
Coach: Hwang Yong Bong

United States
Coach: Albertin Montoya

Group C

Mexico
Coach: Cristopher Cuéllar

New Zealand
Coach:  Paul Temple

Brazil
Coach: Edvaldo Erlacher

Japan
Coach: Hiroshi Yoshida

Group D

Uruguay
Coach: Graciela Rebollo

China PR
Coach: Zhang Chonglai

Ghana
Coach: Mas-Ud Didi Dramani

Germany
Coach:  Anouschka Bernhard

References

FIFA U-17 Women's World Cup squads